William Bradley (1 June 1800 – 6 April 1868) was an Australian politician.

He was born at Windsor in New South Wales to Sergeant Jonas Bradley and Catherine. On 10 August 1831 he married Emily Elizabeth Hovell (1811–1848), with whom he had eight children. She was the daughter of explorer William Hilton Hovell. He farmed near Bredbo and Goulburn, and at the latter ran a flour mill and brewery, which survives as the Old Goulburn Brewery.

He became a significant landholder in the Monaro region of New South Wales, when he took over the leasehold of 'Dandelong', from the bankrupt John Mackenzie, in 1848, and later, acquired 'Coolrington'.

He was a member of the New South Wales Legislative Council, first as an elected member from 1843 to 1846 and then as an appointee from 1851 to 1856. Bradley died at Darling Point in 1868.

References

 

1800 births
1868 deaths
Members of the New South Wales Legislative Council
19th-century Australian politicians